Chris Murray (born October 25, 1974) is a Canadian former professional ice hockey player. He played between 1994 and 2000 in the National Hockey League (NHL).

Playing career
Murray was drafted 54th overall by the Montreal Canadiens in 1994 from the Western Hockey League's Kamloops Blazers and started his National Hockey League career with the Canadiens in the 1994–95 NHL season. He remained with the team for the best of three years before he was part of a three-way trade between Montreal, the Phoenix Coyotes and the Hartford Whalers on March 18, 1997. Murray was first traded to Phoenix with Murray Baron for Dave Manson and was then traded to Hartford for Gerald Diduck. The next season the Whalers relocated to Raleigh, North Carolina and became the Carolina Hurricanes. He played seven games for Carolina before he was traded to the Ottawa Senators for Sean Hill On March 23, 1999, he was traded once more, this time to the Chicago Blackhawks for Nelson Emerson and a draft pick, but he played just four games for the team before sustaining a shoulder injury. In the fall of 1999 he was claimed on waivers by Dallas. He split time with them and their farm team, the Michigan K-Wings of the International Hockey League. He signed with the St. Louis Blues for the 2000-2001 season, but he was demoted to the Worcester IceCats of the American Hockey League. There he suffered what would later prove to be a career ending injury. He joined the Toronto Maple Leafs organization in the fall of 2001 in a failed attempt to rehabilitate his injury, and he retired on his 27th birthday, October 25, 2001.

Post-playing career
After retiring from hockey Murray worked at the Kamloops Fire Department, and also served as a part-time assistant coach for the WHL Kamloops Blazers. He also dedicated a lot of his time to coaching for the Kamloops Minor Hockey Association.

Career statistics

Regular season and playoffs

External links

1974 births
Living people
Bellingham Ice Hawks players
Canadian ice hockey forwards
Carolina Hurricanes players
Chicago Blackhawks players
Dallas Stars players
Fredericton Canadiens players
Hartford Whalers players
Ice hockey people from British Columbia
Kamloops Blazers players
Kalamazoo Wings (1974–2000) players
Montreal Canadiens draft picks
Montreal Canadiens players
Ottawa Senators players
Worcester IceCats players